Articulationes cinguli membri may refer to:

 Articulationes cinguli membri inferioris
 Articulationes cinguli membri superioris